Qurjaq (also Romanized as Qūrjāq and Qeverjāq) is a village in Kolah Boz-e Sharqi Rural District, in the Central District of Meyaneh County, East Azerbaijan Province, Iran. At the 2006 census, its population was 242, in 47 families.

References 

Populated places in Meyaneh County